Music Canada was a Canadian music television miniseries which aired approximately monthly on CBC Television from 1966 to 1967.

Premise
This series featured various special productions of music and dance, from classical to modern styles.

Scheduling
The eight episodes of this hour-long series was broadcast on occasional Wednesdays at 9:30 p.m. (Eastern) from 19 October 1966 to 24 May 1967.

Music Canada returned to CBC Television in 1985 featuring a similar concept.

Episodes

 19 October 1966: "Prelude to Expo", a Montreal concert featuring the Oscar Peterson Trio, Marcel Carignan, Jean-Pierre Ferland, Pauline Julien, Gordon Lightfoot, Aldor Morin and Miriam Makeba. Jimmy Dale conducted the orchestra. The broadcast included Vincent Warren of Les Grands Ballets Canadiens with choreography by Suzanne Verdal. The Expo 67 site was seen in the background which was under construction at that time. Paddy Sampson produced this broadcast, with writer Barry Callaghan.
 2 November 1966: "Percy Faith: Off the Record", dedicated to the bandleader and composer. The broadcast featured Elwood Glover's interviews with Faith and scenes of Faith's conducting work. Also performing here were Shirley Harmer (singer), Martine van Hamel (dancer) and the National Ballet of Canada's Kristine Sealander and Gunter Pick. Norman Campbell produced this broadcast and Grant Strate was the choreographer.
 7 December 1966: Quebec musicians such as Colette Boky, Joseph Rouleau, Robert Savoie and André Turp performed selections from four operas. Pierre Morin was producer.
 4 January 1967: Beethoven's Ninth Symphony was performed by the Toronto Symphony Orchestra (conducted by Seiji Ozawa), the Festival Singers of Toronto, the Mendelssohn Choir, joined by singers Donald Bell, Maureen Forrester, Lois Marshall and Léopold Simoneau. Franz Kraemer produced this episode on location at Toronto's Massey Hall.
 8 February 1967: "And Then We Wrote" aka "And The Music We Wrote", hosted by Max Ferguson, featured selections from Canadian opera, musicals and ballet. Various musicians were joined by dancers Jeremy Blanton and Veronica Tennant. Norman Campbell produced and directed this broadcast with Stan Daniels as writer and Don Gillies as choreographer.
 22 February 1967: "The Thirties" featured host Patrick Watson narrated music selections concerning the Great Depression. The Mart Kenney Orchestra was joined by featured guest Norma Locke and various vocalists. Arrangement was handled by Jimmy Dale (music) and Billy Van (vocals). Paddy Sampson was the broadcast's producer with Watson and Stan Daniels as writers.
 12 April 1967: Rose Latulippe, performed by the Royal Winnipeg Ballet, was a work created specially for the Canadian Centennial by Harry Freedman (composer) and Brian Macdonald (choreographer) and opened the previous year at the Stratford Festival. Pierre Morin produced this colour broadcast for a 90-minute time slot. Costumes and decoration were handled by Robert Prevost.
 24 May 1967: "Hello Delhi!" was hosted by Gordie Tapp and featured world music.

References

External links
 

CBC Television original programming
1966 Canadian television series debuts
1967 Canadian television series endings